Julius Thomson may refer to:

 Julius Thomson (fencer) (1888–1960), German Olympic fencer
 Julius Thomson (rower) (1882–1940), Canadian Olympic rower